The 1962–63 Alpha Ethniki was the 27th season of the highest football league of Greece. The season began on 23 September 1962 and ended on 30 June 1963 with the play-off match. AEK Athens won their third Greek title and their first in 23 years.

The point system was: Win: 3 points - Draw: 2 points - Loss: 1 point.

League table

Results

Championship play-off

AEK Athens won due to the better total goal ratio.

Top scorers

External links
Hellenic Football Federation 
Rec.Sport.Soccer Statistics Foundation

Alpha Ethniki seasons
Greece
1962–63 in Greek football leagues